Henry Conyngham may refer to:

Henry Conyngham (soldier) (pre-1681–c. 1705), soldier and politician
Henry Conyngham, 1st Earl Conyngham (1705–1781), British nobleman and politician
Henry Conyngham, 1st Marquess Conyngham (1766–1832), politician of the Regency period
Henry Francis Conyngham, Earl of Mount Charles (1795–1824), Irish Tory politician
Henry Conyngham, 4th Marquess Conyngham (1857–1897)
Henry Conyngham, 8th Marquess Conyngham (born 1951), Irish peer and politician